Whatever: The '90s Pop & Culture Box is a seven-disc, 130-track box set of popular music hits of the 1990s. Released by Rhino Records in 2005, the box set was based on the success of Have a Nice Decade: The 70s Pop Culture Box, and Like Omigod! The 80s Pop Culture Box (Totally), Rhino's box sets covering the 1970s and 1980s respectively.

Whatever includes an 86-page booklet of cultural comment, a timeline for the decade, and liner notes for the tracks included in the set. Many of the 1990s musical styles — rock, pop, rap, alternative— are represented. The collection was packaged with coffee beans and was included in Pitchfork Media's 2010 list of "five absurd CD packages".

Track listing

Disc 1 
 "U Can't Touch This" - MC Hammer
 "Nothing Compares 2 U" - Sinéad O'Connor
 "No Myth" - Michael Penn
 "Ladies First" - Queen Latifah featuring Monie Love
 "Ball and Chain" - Social Distortion
 "Birdhouse in Your Soul" - They Might Be Giants
 "Chloe Dancer/Crown of Thorns" - Mother Love Bone
 "Here's Where the Story Ends" - The Sundays
 "Gonna Make You Sweat (Everybody Dance Now)" - C+C Music Factory
 "Groove Is in the Heart" - Deee-Lite
 "Right Here, Right Now" - Jesus Jones
 "New Jack Hustler (Nino's Theme)" - Ice-T
 "I Touch Myself" - Divinyls
 "Unbelievable" - EMF
 "Hard to Handle" - The Black Crowes
 "O.P.P." - Naughty by Nature
 "Walking in Memphis" - Marc Cohn
 "It's So Hard to Say Goodbye to Yesterday" - Boyz II Men

Disc 2
 "Silent Lucidity" - Queensrÿche
 "Into the Drink" - Mudhoney
 "Girlfriend" - Matthew Sweet
 "I'm Too Sexy" - Right Said Fred
 "Calling All Angels" - Jane Siberry with k.d. lang
 "Only Shallow" - My Bloody Valentine
 "It's a Shame About Ray" - The Lemonheads
 "Baby Got Back" - Sir Mix-a-Lot
 "They Want EFX" - Das EFX
 "Jump" - Kris Kross
 "Walk" - Pantera 
 "N.W.O." - Ministry
 "Shitlist" - L7
 "Absynthe" - The Gits
 "Coattail Rider" - Supersuckers
 "Runaway Train" - Soul Asylum
 "Little Miss Can't Be Wrong" - Spin Doctors
 "Dizz Knee Land" - dada
 "Nearly Lost You" - Screaming Trees

Disc 3 
 "Under the Bridge" - Red Hot Chili Peppers
 "Unsung" - Helmet
 "Jump Around" - House of Pain
 "Free Your Mind" - En Vogue
 "Rump Shaker" - Wreckx-n-Effect
 "Informer" - Snow
 "Connected" - Stereo MCs
 "Detachable Penis" - King Missile
 "Freak Me" - Silk
 "Ordinary World" - Duran Duran
 "If I Can't Change Your Mind" - Sugar
 "Three Little Pigs" - Green Jellÿ
 "Start Choppin" - Dinosaur Jr.
 "The Devil's Chasing Me" - The Reverend Horton Heat
 "Gone to the Moon" - Fastbacks
 "My Name Is Mud" - Primus
 "What's Up?" - 4 Non Blondes

Disc 4
 "Thunder Kiss '65" - White Zombie
 "Whoomp! (There It Is)" - Tag Team
 "Broken Hearted Savior" - Big Head Todd and the Monsters
 "Trust Me" - Guru (with N'Dea Davenport)
 "Gepetto" - Belly
 "Eye to Eye" - The Muffs
 "Gentlemen" - The Afghan Whigs
 "Leafy Incline" - Tad
 "Dream All Day" - The Posies
 "Hey Jealousy" - Gin Blossoms
 "My Sister" - The Juliana Hatfield Three
 "Whatta Man" - Salt-N-Pepa (with En Vogue)
 "Back & Forth" - Aaliyah
 "If That's Your Boyfriend (He Wasn't Last Night)" - Meshell Ndegeocello
 "Freedom of '76" - Ween
 "Cut Your Hair" - Pavement
 "God" - Tori Amos
 "Mmm Mmm Mmm Mmm" - Crash Test Dummies
 "Possession" - Sarah McLachlan

Disc 5
 "Shine" - Collective Soul
 "Far Behind" - Candlebox
 "You Gotta Be" - Des'ree
 "Girl, You'll Be a Woman Soon" - Urge Overkill
 "She Don't Use Jelly" - The Flaming Lips
 "M.I.A." - 7 Year Bitch
 "21st Century (Digital Boy)" - Bad Religion
 "Sugar Free Jazz" - Soul Coughing
 "Mockingbirds" - Grant Lee Buffalo
 "What's the Frequency, Kenneth?" - R.E.M.
 "Revolve" - Melvins
 "Buddy Holly" - Weezer
 "Here & Now" - Letters to Cleo
 "Good" - Better Than Ezra
 "Run-Around" - Blues Traveler
 "I'll Be There for You (Theme from Friends)" - The Rembrandts
 "Tomorrow" - Silverchair
 "Not a Pretty Girl" - Ani DiFranco
 "Carnival" - Natalie Merchant

Disc 6
 "Wonderwall" - Oasis
 "Birthday Cake" - Cibo Matto
 "Cumbersome" - Seven Mary Three
 "One of Us" - Joan Osborne
 "Caught by the Fuzz" - Supergrass
 "Sweet '69" - Babes in Toyland
 "Breakfast at Tiffany's" - Deep Blue Something
 "Photograph" - The Verve Pipe
 "In the Meantime" - Spacehog
 "Woo Hah!! Got You All in Check" (featuring Rampage the Last Boy Scout) - Busta Rhymes
 "Who Will Save Your Soul" - Jewel
 "Standing Outside a Broken Phone Booth with Money in My Hand" - Primitive Radio Gods
 "Cybele's Reverie" - Stereolab
 "Capri Pants" - Bikini Kill
 "What I Got" - Sublime
 "Kung Fu" - Ash
 "Virtual Insanity" - Jamiroquai
 "Naked Eye" - Luscious Jackson
 "Outtasite (Outta Mind)" - Wilco

Disc 7
 "Itzsoweezee (HOT)" - De La Soul
 "Lovefool" - The Cardigans
 "Radiation Vibe" - Fountains of Wayne
 "The Impression That I Get" - The Mighty Mighty Bosstones
 "Turn It On" - Sleater-Kinney
 "Bitch" - Meredith Brooks
 "MMMBop" - Hanson
 "Brian Wilson (Live)" - Barenaked Ladies
 "Brick" - Ben Folds Five
 "Sex and Candy" - Marcy Playground
 "Walkin' on the Sun" - Smash Mouth
 "Tubthumping" - Chumbawamba
 "6 Underground" - Sneaker Pimps
 "Lullaby" - Shawn Mullins
 "Slide" - Goo Goo Dolls
 "Kiss Me" - Sixpence None the Richer
 "Steal My Sunshine" - Len
 "What It's Like" - Everlast
 "Natural Blues" - Moby

References

2005 compilation albums
Pop compilation albums
Rhino Records compilation albums
Rock compilation albums